The 2016 International Darts Open was the seventh of ten PDC European Tour events on the 2016 PDC Pro Tour. The tournament took place at SACHSENarena in Riesa, Germany, between 2–4 September 2016. It featured a field of 48 players and £115,000 in prize money, with £25,000 going to the winner.

Michael Smith was the defending champion, but he lost 6–4 to James Wilson in the second round.

Mensur Suljović won the final 6–5 against Kim Huybrechts, winning his first PDC European Tour title, after Huybrechts missed seven match darts in the final leg to win the match himself.

Prize money
The prize money of the European Tour events stays the same as last year.

Qualification and format
The top 16 players from the PDC ProTour Order of Merit on 22 June automatically qualified for the event and were seeded in the second round. The remaining 32 places went to players from three qualifying events - 20 from the UK Qualifier (held in Barnsley on 1 July), eight from the European Qualifier on 1 September and four from the Host Nation Qualifier on 1 September.

James Wade withdrew from the tournament the day before it began, so seeds 4-16 moved up one space each, and Daryl Gurney became the 16th seed, with an extra space being made for a Host Nation Qualifier.

Michael van Gerwen withdrew due to an ankle injury from the tournament the day it began, quickly followed by Daryl Gurney, who withdrew due to a broken finger in his dart throwing hand. Amazingly, the players they were due to play in round 2 (Ryan Meikle and Yordi Meeuwisse) received byes to play each other in round 3.

The following players took part in the tournament:

Top 16
  Michael van Gerwen (withdrew)
  Peter Wright (third round)
  Kim Huybrechts (runner-up)
  Dave Chisnall (third round)
  Michael Smith (second round)
  Ian White (third round)
  Benito van de Pas (semi-finals)
  Jelle Klaasen (third round)
  Mensur Suljović (winner)
  Robert Thornton (third round)
  Gerwyn Price (second round)
  Terry Jenkins (third round)
  Alan Norris (second round)
  Stephen Bunting (second round)
  Simon Whitlock (quarter-finals)
  Daryl Gurney (withdrew)

UK Qualifier
  James Wilson (semi-finals)
  Joe Cullen (second round)
  Jim Walker (second round)
  Andy Hamilton (first round)
  Michael Barnard (first round)
  James Richardson (first round)
  Jamie Caven (first round)
  Kyle Anderson (second round)
  Brendan Dolan (first round)
  Andy Boulton (quarter-finals)
  Kevin Painter (first round)
  Robbie Green (third round)
  Ryan Meikle (third round)
  Mark Frost (first round)
  Ricky Evans (first round)
  Devon Petersen (second round)
  Chris Dobey (second round)
  Darren Webster (second round)
  Steve West (second round)

European Qualifier
  Ronny Huybrechts (second round)
  Jeffrey de Graaf (first round)
  Jeffrey de Zwaan (first round)
  Jermaine Wattimena (second round)
  Krzysztof Ratajski (first round)
  Michael Rasztovits (first round)
  Vincent Kamphuis (first round)
  Yordi Meeuwisse (quarter-finals)

Host Nation Qualifier
  Maik Langendorf (first round)
  René Eidams (first round)
  Max Hopp (first round)
  Dragutin Horvat (quarter-finals)
  Mike Holz (second round)

Draw

References

2016 PDC European Tour
2016 in German sport